D-5 is a professional digital video format introduced by Panasonic in 1994. Like Sony's D-1 (8-bit), it is an uncompressed digital component system (10-bit), but uses the same half-inch tapes as Panasonic's digital composite D-3 format. A 120 min. D-3 tape will record 60 min. in D-5/D-5 HD mode.  D-5 standard definition decks can be retrofitted to record high definition with the use of an external HD input/output box. The HD deck conversion does not allow for any error correction that exists on standard definition recordings, as the full bandwidth of the tape is required for the HD recording.

D-5 HD
D-5 HD uses standard D-5 videotape videotapes to record HD material, using an intra-frame compression with a 4:1 ratio. D-5 HD supports the 1080 and the 1035 interlaced line standards at both 60 Hz and 59.94 Hz field rates, all 720 progressive line standards and the 1080 progressive line standard at 24, 25 and 30 frame rates. Four 48 kHz 24-bit PCM audio channels, or eight 48 kHz 20-bit channels, are also supported. D-5 runs at different data rates for different formats (taken from the hardware manual for the AJ-HD3700B:

 323 Mbit/s (1080/59.94i/8CH, 720/59.94p/8CH, 480/59.94i/8CH)
 319 Mbit/s (576/50i/8CH)
 300 Mbit/s (1080/59.94i/4CH, 720/59.94p/4CH, 480/59.94i/4CH)
 258 Mbit/s (1080/23.98p/8CH, 1080/24p/8CH)
 269 Mbit/s (1080/50i/8CH, 1080/25p/8CH, 576/50i/4CH)

HD material is often captured for post production of film projects, whereby the D-5 HD scanning equipment is cheaper by the hour than a full resolution 2K film scan.

As of 2010, no D-5 HD camcorders have been offered for sale. Panasonic instead markets DVCPRO HD and P2 camcorders for field production of 720P or 1080i and 1080p images.

In 2007, Panasonic introduced an add-on box (AJ-HDP2000) that allows a standard D-5 VTR to encode 2K (2048 x 1080) resolution material with 4:4:4 color space onto D-5 tape using the industry standard JPEG2000 wavelet-based compression.

References

See also
 D-VHS
 W-VHS
 DVCAM
 DVCPRO
 D-1 (Sony)
 D-2 (video)
 D-3 (video)
 D6 HDTV VTR

Video storage
Audiovisual introductions in 1994